Les Dévalideuses are a French feminist collective, focused on fighting for disabled women within feminism. Led by Céline Extenso, the collective was founded in October 2019 to fight the marginalisation of disabled women within the feminist movement. The idea to form the group had started after the NousToutes public demonstrations in late 2018, in which the Dévalideuses founders noted a significant lack of visibility of disabled women within the movement despite the significant rates of violence faced by disabled women. 

In January 2020, the collective ran a social media campaign under the hashtag #JarrêteLeValidisme to raise awareness of ableism.

In February 2020, the collective signed an open letter with over 50 other prominent feminist activists and organisations condemning "the import of transphobia into French feminism."

In April 2021, they published a manifesto in Mediapart, describing themselves as anti-ableist, feminist, and intersection, as well as aiming to work for public awareness and radical activism.

References

External links 
Official website

Feminist organizations in France
Disability rights organizations